The 2008 Los Angeles Dodgers season featured the Dodgers celebrating their Golden Anniversary in Southern California under new manager Joe Torre as they won the National League West for the first time since 2004, and returned to the postseason after missing the playoffs in 2007. The Dodgers did not peak until September when the won 17-8, which was highlighted by the acquisition of superstar outfielder Manny Ramirez.  Ramirez hit .396 with 17 HRs in 53 games after the trade on July 31st.  They swept the Chicago Cubs in the NLDS to advance to the NLCS.  It was their first playoff series win since 1988 when they went on to win the World Series. However, they lost to the Philadelphia Phillies in five games in the NLCS.

Season standings

National League West

Record vs. opponents

Opening Day starters

Notable transactions

June 6, 2008 Acquired Ángel Berroa from the Kansas City Royals for Juan Rivera and cash.
July 28, 2008 Acquired Casey Blake from the Cleveland Indians for Carlos Santana and Jon Meloan.
July 31, 2008, Acquired Manny Ramirez from the Boston Red Sox in a 3-team trade,  Andy LaRoche and  Bryan Morris went to the Pittsburgh Pirates.
August 19, 2008, Acquired Greg Maddux from the San Diego Padres for two players to be named later or cash considerations.

2008 roster

Game log

|-align="center" bgcolor="#bbffbb"
| 1 || March 31 || Giants || 5–0 || Penny (1–0) || Zito (0–1) || || 56,000 || 1–0
|-align="center" bgcolor="#bbffbb" 
| 2 || April 1 || Giants || 3–2 || Saito (1–0)  || Yabu (0–1)||  || 44,054 || 2–0
|- align="center" bgcolor="#ffbbbb" 
| 3 || April 2 || Giants || 2–1 || Lincecum (1–0) || Loaiza (0–1) || Wilson (1) || 43,217 || 2–1
|- align="center" bgcolor="#bbffbb"
| 4 || April 4 || @ Padres || 7–1 || Kuroda (1–0) || Thatcher (0–1) || || 42,474 || 3–1
|-  align="center" bgcolor="#ffbbbb" 
| 5 || April 5 || @ Padres || 4–1 ||Peavy (2–0)  || Penny (1–1) || || 38,819 || 3–2
|- align="center" bgcolor="#bbffbb" 
| 6 || April 6 || @ Padres || 3–2 || Broxton (1–0) || Hoffman (0–2) || Saito (1) || 44,165 || 4–2
|-  align="center" bgcolor="#ffbbbb" 
| 7 || April 7 || @ Diamondbacks || 9–3 || Haren (1–0) || Loaiza (0–2) || || 49,507 || 4–3
|-  align="center" bgcolor="#ffbbbb" 
| 8 || April 8 || @ Diamondbacks || 10–5 || Davis (1–1) || Billingsley (0–1) || || 28,973 || 4–4
|-  align="center" bgcolor="#ffbbbb" 
| 9 || April 9 || @ Diamondbacks || 4–3 || Owings (2–0) || Kuroda (0–1) || Lyon (1) || 23,331 || 4–5
|-  align="center" bgcolor="#ffbbbb" 
| 10 || April 11 || Padres || 7–5 || Peavy (3–0) || Penny (1–2) || Hoffman (3) || 54,052 || 4–6
|-  align="center" bgcolor="#bbffbb"
| 11 || April 12 || Padres || 11–1 || Lowe (1–0) || Young (1–1) || || 54,955 || 5–6
|-  align="center" bgcolor="#ffbbbb"
| 12 || April 13 || Padres || 1–0 || Maddux (2–0) || Billingsley (0–2) || Hoffman (4) || 47,357 || 5–7
|-  align="center" bgcolor="#ffbbbb"
| 13 || April 14 || Pirates || 6–4 || Yates (2–0) || Saito (1–1) || Capps (4) || 37,334 || 5–8
|-  align="center" bgcolor="#bbffbb"
| 14 || April 15 || Pirates || 11–2 || Loaiza (1–2) || Morris (0–2) || || 37,896 || 6–8
|-  align="center" bgcolor="#bbffbb"
| 15 || April 16 || Pirates || 8–1 || Penny (2–2) || Maholm (0–2) || || 53,629 || 7–8
|-  align="center" bgcolor="#ffbbbb"
| 16 || April 18 || @ Braves || 6–1 || Ohman (1–0) || Lowe (1–1) || || 38,250 || 7–9
|- align="center" bgcolor="#ffbbbb" 
| 17 || April 19 || @ Braves || 4–1 || James (1–1) ||Billingsley (0–3)|| Acosta (1)|| 40,451|| 7–10
|-  align="center" bgcolor="#ffbbbb" 
| 18 || April 20 || @ Braves || 6–1 || Jurrjens (2–2)||Kuroda (1–2) || ||36,772 ||7–11
|-  align="center" bgcolor="#bbffbb"
| 19 || April 21 || @ Reds || 9–3 || Penny (3–2) || Belisle (0–1) ||Park (1) || 14,446|| 8–11
|-  align="center" bgcolor="#ffbbbb" 
| 20 || April 22 || @ Reds || 8–1 || Vólquez (3–0) || Kuo (0–1)|| || 14,763||8–12
|- align="center" bgcolor="#bbffbb" 
| 21 || April 23 || Diamondbacks || 8–3 ||Lowe (2–1)|| Haren (3–1) ||Saito (2) || 42,590||9–12
|-  align="center" bgcolor="#ffbbbb" 
| 22 || April 24 || Diamondbacks || 6–4 ||González (1–1)||Billingsley (0–4) ||Lyon (6) ||38,350 ||9–13
|- align="center" bgcolor="#bbffbb" 
| 23 || April 25 || Rockies || 8–7 (13) || Park (1–0)|| Buchholz (1–2)|| ||53,205 || 10–13
|- align="center" bgcolor="#bbffbb" 
| 24 || April 26 || Rockies || 11–3 ||Penny (4–2)||Redman (2–2) || ||50,469 || 11–13
|-  align="center" bgcolor="#bbffbb"
| 25 || April 27 || Rockies || 3–2 (10) || Beimel (1–0)||Corpas (0–2) || || 50,670||12–13
|-  align="center" bgcolor="#bbffbb"
| 26 || April 29 || @ Marlins || 7–6 || Beimel (2–0) ||Gregg (3–1) || Saito (3) ||11,334 || 13–13
|-  align="center" bgcolor="#bbffbb"
| 27 || April 30 || @ Marlins || 13–1 ||Billingsley (1–4) ||Olsen (3–1) || || 10,792|| 14–13
|-

|- align="center" bgcolor="#bbffbb" 
| 28 || May 1 || @ Marlins || 5–3 ||  Beimel (3–0)||  Gregg (3–2) || Saito (4)|| 15,556||15–13
|-  align="center" bgcolor="#bbffbb"
| 29 || May 2 || @ Rockies || 11–6 ||Penny (5–2)|| Francis (0–3) || ||30,291 ||16–13
|-  align="center" bgcolor="#bbffbb"
| 30 || May 3 || @ Rockies || 12–7 ||Kuo (1–1) || de la Rosa (0–1) || || 38,597||17–13
|- align="center" bgcolor="#ffbbbb"
| 31 || May 4 || @ Rockies || 7–2 || Cook (5–1) ||Lowe (2–2) || Buchholz (1)||43,726 ||17–14
|- align="center" bgcolor="#bbffbb" 
| 32 || May 5 || Mets || 5–1 || Billingsley (2–4)|| Pérez (2–3)|| ||44,181 ||18–14
|- align="center" bgcolor="#bbffbb" 
| 33 || May 6 || Mets || 5–4 ||Kuo (2–1) ||Figueroa (2–2) ||Saito (5) ||43,927 ||19–14
|- align="center" bgcolor="#ffbbbb"
| 34 || May 7 || Mets || 12–1 || Maine (4–2) || Penny (5–3) || ||40,696 ||19–15
|- align="center" bgcolor="#ffbbbb" 
| 35 || May 9 || Astros || 7–1 || Moehler (1–0)||Lowe (2–3) || ||52,658 ||19–16
|- align="center" bgcolor="#ffbbbb"
| 36 || May 10 || Astros || 5–0 || Sampson (2–3) ||Billingsley (2–5) || ||45,212 ||19–17
|- align="center" bgcolor="#ffbbbb"
| 37 || May 11 || Astros || 8–5 || Geary (1–1) || Broxton (1–1) || Valverde (8) || 40,217 || 19–18
|- align="center" bgcolor="#ffbbbb"
| 38 || May 13 || @ Brewers || 5–3 || Villanueva (2–4) ||Penny (5–4) || Gagné (10) ||26,465 ||19–19
|- align="center" bgcolor="#bbffbb"
| 39 || May 14 || @ Brewers || 6–4 ||Broxton (2–1)  ||Mota (1–2) || Saito (6) ||27,562 ||20–19
|- align="center" bgcolor="#bbffbb"
| 40 || May 15 || @ Brewers || 7–2 || Billingsley (3–5) ||Sheets (4–1) || ||30,444 ||21–19
|- align="center" bgcolor="#ffbbbb"
| 41 || May 16 || @ Angels || 4–2 || Saunders (7–1) || Kuroda (1–3) || Rodríguez (17)||44,047 || 21–20
|- align="center" bgcolor="#bbffbb" 
| 42 || May 17 || @ Angels || 6–3 || Kuo (3–1) || Santana (6–1) || ||43,906 ||22–20
|- align="center" bgcolor="#ffbbbb"
| 43 || May 18 || @ Angels || 10–2 || Weaver (3–5) || Lowe (2–4) || || 44,007 || 22–21
|- align="center" bgcolor="#bbffbb"
| 44 || May 19 || Reds || 6–5 || Saito (2–1) || Weathers (1–3) || || 34,669 || 23–21
|- align="center" bgcolor="#bbffbb"
| 45 || May 20 || Reds || 4–1 || Billingsley (4–5) || Belisle (1–4) || Saito (7) || 34,306 || 24–21
|- align="center" bgcolor="#bbffbb"
| 46 || May 21 || Reds || 5–2 || Kuroda (2–3) || Cueto (2–5) || Saito (8) || 33,224 || 25–21
|- align="center" bgcolor="#ffbbbb"
| 47 || May 23 || Cardinals || 2–1 || Wainwright (4–2) || Lowe (2–5) || Franklin (3) || 52,281 || 25–22
|-  align="center" bgcolor="#ffbbbb"
| 48 || May 24 || Cardinals ||4–0 || Lohse (4–2)|| Penny (5–5)|| ||44,785 ||25–23
|-  align="center" bgcolor="#bbffbb"
| 49 || May 25 || Cardinals || 4–3 (10) || Saito (3–1) || Parisi (0–1) || || 46,566 || 26–23
|-  align="center" bgcolor="#ffbbbb"
| 50 || May 26 || @ Cubs || 3–1|| Dempster (6–2) ||Billingsley (4–6) || Wood (11)||41,583 ||26–24
|-  align="center" bgcolor="#ffbbbb"
| 51 || May 27 || @ Cubs || 3–1 || Gallagher (2–1)|| Kuroda (2–4) || Wood (12) || 39,894 || 26–25
|-  align="center" bgcolor="#ffbbbb"
| 52 || May 28 || @ Cubs || 2–1 (10) || Howry (1–2) || Park (1–1)|| || 39,945 || 26–26
|-  align="center" bgcolor="#ffbbbb"
| 53 || May 29 || @ Mets || 8–4 || Vargas (2–2) || Penny (5–6) || || 52,886 || 26–27
|-  align="center" bgcolor="#bbffbb"
| 54 || May 30 || @ Mets || 9–5 || Park (2–1) || Heilman (0–2) || || 52,176 || 27–27
|-  align="center" bgcolor="#ffbbbb"
| 55 || May 31 || @ Mets || 3–2 || Sánchez (2–0) || Broxton (2–2)|| Wagner (11) || 53,528 || 27–28
|-

|-  align="center" bgcolor="#ffbbbb"
| 56 || June 1 || @ Mets || 6–1 ||  Santana (7–3) || Kuroda (2–5) || ||50,263 ||27–29
|-  align="center" bgcolor="#bbffbb"
| 57 || June 2 || Rockies || 8–2 ||Lowe (3–5) || Reynolds (0–3) || ||39,098 ||28–29
|- align="center" bgcolor="#ffbbbb" 
| 58 || June 3 || Rockies || 3–0 ||  Francis (2–5) ||Penny (5–7) ||Fuentes (7) || 38,548||28–30
|-  align="center" bgcolor="#ffbbbb"
| 59 || June 4 || Rockies || 2–1|| Cook (8–3)||Kershaw (0–1) || Fuentes (8)|| 36,393||28–31
|-  align="center" bgcolor="#ffbbbb"
| 60 || June 5 || Cubs ||5–4 ||Howry (2-2) ||Saito (3–2) || Wood (17) ||44,988 ||28–32
|-  align="center" bgcolor="#bbffbb"
| 61 || June 6 || Cubs ||3–0 ||Kuroda (3–5) ||  Gallagher (3–2) || ||52,484 ||29–32
|-  align="center" bgcolor="#bbffbb"
| 62 || June 7 || Cubs || 7–3 || Lowe (4–5) || Zambrano (8–2) || ||50,020 ||30–32
|-  align="center" bgcolor="#ffbbbb"
| 63 || June 8 || Cubs || 3–1 || Marquis (4–3) ||  Penny  (5–8) ||Wood (18) || 49,994|| 30–33
|- align="center" bgcolor="#bbffbb"
| 64 || June 10 || @ Padres || 7–2  || Proctor (1–0)|| Hampson (0–1)|| ||26,860 ||31–33
|-  align="center" bgcolor="#ffbbbb"
| 65 || June 11 || @ Padres ||4–1 || Wolf (5–4)||Billingsley (4–7) || Hoffman (15)|| 29,218||31–34
|-  align="center" bgcolor="#ffbbbb"
| 66 || June 12 || @ Padres ||9–0 || Peavy (5–3) || Kuroda (3–6) || || 36,354||31–35
|-  align="center" bgcolor="#ffbbbb"
| 67 || June 13 || @ Tigers || 5–0 || Galarrage (6–2)|| Lowe (4–6) ||Dolsi (2) || 40,430|| 31–36
|-  align="center" bgcolor="#ffbbbb"
| 68 || June 14 || @ Tigers || 12–7 || Bonine (1–0) || Penny (5–9) || ||42,348 ||31–37
|-  align="center" bgcolor="#ffbbbb"
| 69 || June 15 || @ Tigers || 5–4 || Robertson (5–6) || Park (2–2) || Jones (12) || 41,189 || 31–38
|-  align="center" bgcolor="#bbffbb"
| 70 || June 17 || @ Reds ||3–1 || Billingsley (5–7) || Cueto (5–7) || Saito (9)|| 26,906||32–38
|-  align="center" bgcolor="#bbffbb"
| 71 || June 18 || @ Reds || 6–1 || Lowe (5–6)|| Arroyo (4–6)|| ||20,055 ||33–38
|-  align="center" bgcolor="#bbffbb"
| 72 || June 19 || @ Reds || 7–4 ||Stults (1–0) || Harang (3–10)||Saito (10) ||30,136 ||34–38
|-  align="center" bgcolor="#ffbbbb"
| 73 || June 20 || Indians || 6–4 (10) || Borowski (1–2) || Saito (3–3) || Kobayashi (4) || 50,667 || 34–39
|-  align="center" bgcolor="#ffbbbb"
| 74 || June 21 || Indians || 7–2 (11) || Kobayashi (4–3) || Wade (0–1) || || 45,036 || 34–40
|-  align="center" bgcolor="#bbffbb"
| 75 || June 22 || Indians || 4–3 || Billingsley (6–7) || Byrd (3–8) || Saito (11) || 39,993 || 35–40
|-  align="center" bgcolor="#ffbbbb"
| 76 || June 24 || White Sox || 6–1 || Buehrle (5–6) || Lowe (5–7) || || 43,900 || 35–41
|-  align="center" bgcolor="bbffbb"
| 77 || June 25 || White Sox || 5–0 || Stults (2–0) || Floyd (8–4) || || 40,162 || 36–41
|-  align="center" bgcolor="#ffbbbb"
| 78 || June 26 || White Sox || 2–0 || Danks (5–4) || Kershaw (0–2) || Jenks (17) || 37,956 || 36–42
|-  align="center" bgcolor="bbffbb"
| 79 || June 27 || Angels || 6–0 || Park (3–2) || Saunders (11–4) || || 50,419 || 37–42
|-  align="center" bgcolor="bbffbb"
| 80 || June 28 || Angels || 1–0 || Billingsley (7–7) || Weaver (7–8) || Saito (12) || 55,784 || 38–42
|-  align="center" bgcolor="#ffbbbb"
| 81 || June 29 || Angels || 1–0 || Lackey (6–1) || Lowe (5–8) || Rodríguez (32) || 48,155 || 38–43
|-  align="center" bgcolor="#ffbbbb"
| 82 || June 30 || @ Astros || 4–1 || Oswalt (7–8) || Stults (2–1) || Valverde (22) || 28,827 || 38–44
|-

|-  align="center" bgcolor="bbffbb"
| 83 || July 1 || @ Astros || 7–6 (11) || Park (4–2) || Wright (3–3) || Saito (13) || 31,914 || 39–44
|-  align="center" bgcolor="bbffbb"
| 84 || July 2 || @ Astros || 4–1 || Kuroda (4–6) || Hernández (0–2) || || 34,058 || 40–44
|-  align="center" bgcolor="bbffbb"
| 85 || July 3 || @ Astros || 5–2 || Billingsley (8–7) || Backe (5–9) || Saito (14) || 35,696 || 41–44
|-  align="center" bgcolor="bbffbb"
| 86 || July 4 || @ Giants || 10–7 || Lowe (6–8) || Matos (0–1) || Saito (15) || 40,447 || 42–44
|-  align="center" bgcolor="#ffbbbb" 
| 87 || July 5 || @ Giants || 5–2 || Zito (4–12) || Falkenborg (0–1) || Wilson (24) || 40,741 || 42–45
|-  align="center" bgcolor="bbffbb"
| 88 || July 6 || @ Giants || 5–3 || Falkenborg (1–1) || Cain (5–7) || Saito (16) || 39,290 || 43–45
|-  align="center" bgcolor="bbffbb"
| 89 || July 7 || Braves || 3–0 || Kuroda (5–6) || Campillo (3–4) || || 39,896 || 44–45
|-  align="center" bgcolor="#ffbbbb"
| 90 || July 8 || Braves || 9–3 || Jurrjens (9–4) || Billingsley (8–8) || || 39,702 || 44–46
|-  align="center" bgcolor="bbffbb"
| 91 || July 9 || Braves || 2–1 || Lowe (7–8) || Hudson (9–7) || Saito (17) || 39,815 || 45–46
|-  align="center" bgcolor="ffbbbb"
| 92 || July 10 || Marlins || 5–4 (11) || Nelson (2–0) || Falkenborg (1–2) || Gregg (18) || 40,417 || 45–47
|-  align="center" bgcolor="ffbbbb"
| 93 || July 11 || Marlins || 3–1 || Volstad (2–0) || Stults (2–2) || Gregg (19) || 49,545 || 45–48
|-  align="center" bgcolor="ffbbbb"
| 94 || July 12 || Marlins || 5–3 (11) || Waechter (1–2) || Troncoso (0–1) || Gregg (20) || 55,220 || 45–49
|-  align="center" bgcolor="bbffbb"
| 95 || July 13 || Marlins || 9–1 || Billingsley (9–8) || Miller (5–9) || || 42,213 || 46–49
|-  align="center" bgcolor="bbffbb"
| 96 || July 18 || @ Diamondbacks || 8–7 (11) || Wade (1–1) || Slaten (0–3) || Broxton (1) || 38,561 || 47–49
|-  align="center" bgcolor="ffbbbb"
| 97 || July 19 || @ Diamondbacks || 3–2 || Haren (9–5) || Billingsley (9–9)  || Lyon (20) || 41,458 || 47–50
|-  align="center" bgcolor="bbffbb"
| 98 || July 20 || @ Diamondbacks || 6–5 || Troncoso (1–1) || Lyon (2–4) || Broxton (2) || 39,217 || 48–50
|-  align="center" bgcolor="bbffbb"
| 99 || July 21 || @ Rockies || 16–10 || Falkenborg (2–2) || Wells (1–2) || || 38,291 || 49–50
|-  align="center" bgcolor="ffbbbb"
| 100 || July 22 || @ Rockies || 10–1 || Jiménez (6–9) || Kershaw (0–3) || || 41,567 || 49–51
|-  align="center" bgcolor="ffbbbb"
| 101 || July 23 || @ Rockies || 5–3 || Rusch (4–3) || Kuroda (5–7) || Fuentes (17) || 36,305 || 49–52
|-  align="center" bgcolor="bbffbb"
| 102 || July 25 || Nationals || 3–2 || Billingsley (10–9) || Lannan (6–10) || Broxton (3) || 47,313 || 50–52
|-  align="center" bgcolor="bbffbb"
| 103 || July 26 || Nationals || 6–0 || Lowe (8–8) || Pérez (3–8) || || 42,122 || 51–52
|-  align="center" bgcolor="bbffbb"
| 104 || July 27 || Nationals || 2–0 || Kershaw (1–3) || Bergmann (1–8) || Broxton (4) || 38,660 || 52–52
|-  align="center" bgcolor="ffbbbb"
| 105 || July 28 || Giants || 7–6 || Correia (2–5) || Kuroda (5–8) || Wilson (28) || 37,483 || 52–53
|-  align="center" bgcolor="bbffbb"
| 106 || July 29 || Giants || 2–0 || Johnson (1–0) || Cain (6–9) || Broxton (5) || 40,110 || 53–53
|-  align="center" bgcolor="bbffbb"
| 107 || July 30 || Giants || 4–0 || Billingsley (11–9) || Sánchez (8–7) || || 41,282 || 54–53
|-  align="center" bgcolor="ffbbbb"
| 108 || July 31 || Diamondbacks || 2–1 || Webb (15–4) || Lowe (8–9) || Lyon (23) || 42,440 || 54–54
|-

|-  align="center" bgcolor="ffbbbb"
| 109 || August 1 || Diamondbacks || 2–1 || Johnson (9–7) || Park (4–3) || Lyon (24) || 55,239 || 54–55
|-  align="center" bgcolor="bbffbb"
| 110 || August 2 || Diamondbacks || 4–2 || Kuroda (6–8) || Petit (1–2) || Park (2) || 54,544 || 55–55
|-  align="center" bgcolor="bbffbb"
| 111 || August 3 || Diamondbacks || 9–3 || Wade (2–1) || Davis (4–6) || || 52,972 || 56–55
|-  align="center" bgcolor="ffbbbb"
| 112 || August 5 || @ Cardinals || 6–4 (11) || García (1–1) || Johnson (1–1) || || 40,773 || 56–56
|-  align="center" bgcolor="ffbbbb"
| 113 || August 6 || @ Cardinals || 9–6 || Piñeiro (4–5) || Lowe (8–10) || Perez (1) || 42,581 || 56–57
|-  align="center" bgcolor="bbffbb"
| 114 || August 7 || @ Cardinals || 4–1 || Kershaw (2–3) || Lohse (13–4) || Broxton (6) || 40,500 || 57–57
|-  align="center" bgcolor="bbffbb"
| 115 || August 8 || @ Giants || 6–2 || Penny (6–9) || Zito (6–14) || Broxton (7) || 40,142 || 58–57
|-  align="center" bgcolor="ffbbbb"
| 116 || August 9 || @ Giants || 3–2 (10) || Walker (4–6) || Broxton (2–3) || || 41,963 || 58–58
|-  align="center" bgcolor="ffbbbb"
| 117 || August 10 || @ Giants || 5–4 || Taschner (3–1) || Kuo (3–2) || || 41,804 || 58–59
|-  align="center" bgcolor="bbffbb"
| 118 || August 11 || Phillies || 8–6 || Lowe (9–10) || Kendrick (10–6) || Broxton (8) || 45,547 || 59–59
|-  align="center" bgcolor="bbffbb"
| 119 || August 12 || Phillies || 4–3 || Kuo (4–2) || Romero (4–4) || || 47,586 || 60–59
|-  align="center" bgcolor="bbffbb"
| 120 || August 13 || Phillies || 7–6 || Broxton (3–3) || Condrey (3–3) || || 45,786 || 61–59
|-  align="center" bgcolor="bbffbb"
| 121 || August 14 || Phillies || 3–1 || Kuroda (7–8) || Myers (5–10) || Kuo (1) || 51,060 || 62–59
|-  align="center" bgcolor="bbffbb"
| 122 || August 15 || Brewers || 5–3 || Billingsley (12–9) || Parra (9–6) || Broxton (9) || 44,547 || 63–59
|-  align="center" bgcolor="ffbbbb"
| 123 || August 16 || Brewers || 4–3 (10) || Torres (6–3) || Broxton (3–4) || Riske (2) || 52,889 || 63–60
|-  align="center" bgcolor="bbffbb"
| 124 || August 17 || Brewers || 7–5 || Beimel (4–0) || Villanueva (4–6) || || 45,267 || 64–60
|-  align="center" bgcolor="ffbbbb"
| 125 || August 19 || Rockies || 8–3 || Jiménez (9–11) || Kuroda (7–9) || || 46,687 || 64–61
|-  align="center" bgcolor="ffbbbb"
| 126 || August 20 || Rockies || 4–3 || Buchholz (6–3) || Broxton (3–5) || Fuentes (24) || 48,183 || 64–62
|-  align="center" bgcolor="bbffbb"
| 127 || August 21 || Rockies || 3–1 || Lowe (10–10) || de la Rosa (6–7) || Broxton (10) || 44,885 || 65–62
|-  align="center" bgcolor="ffbbbb"
| 128 || August 22 || @ Phillies || 8–1 || Kendrick (11–7) || Maddux (6–10) || || 42,620 || 65–63
|-  align="center" bgcolor="ffbbbb"
| 129 || August 23 || @ Phillies || 9–2 || Hamels (11–8) || Kershaw (2–4) || || 45,019 || 65–64
|-  align="center" bgcolor="ffbbbb"
| 130 || August 24 || @ Phillies || 5–2 (11) || Durbin (5–2) || Beimel (4–1) || || 43,039 || 65–65
|-  align="center" bgcolor="ffbbbb"
| 131 || August 25 || @ Phillies || 5–0 || Myers (7–10) || Billingsley (12–10) || || 40,873 || 65–66
|-  align="center" bgcolor="ffbbbb"
| 132 || August 26 || @ Nationals || 2–1 || Balester (3–6) || Lowe (10–11) || Hanrahan (5) || 26,110 || 65–67
|-  align="center" bgcolor="ffbbbb"
| 133 || August 27 || @ Nationals || 5–4 || Redding (9–8) || Maddux (6–11) || Hanrahan (6) || 22,907 || 65–68
|-  align="center" bgcolor="ffbbbb"
| 134 || August 28 || @ Nationals || 11–2 || Lannan (8–12) || Kershaw (2–5) || || 26,338 || 65–69
|-  align="center" bgcolor="ffbbbb"
| 135 || August 29 || @ Diamondbacks || 9–3 || Davis (6–8) || Kuroda (7–10) || || 32,610 || 65–70
|-  align="center" bgcolor="bbffbb"
| 136 || August 30 || @ Diamondbacks || 6–2 || Billingsley (13–10) || Haren (14–7) || || 49,045 || 66–70
|-  align="center" bgcolor="bbffbb"
| 137 || August 31 || @ Diamondbacks || 8–1 || Lowe (11–11) || Webb (19–6) || || 43,456 || 67–70
|-

|-  align="center" bgcolor="bbffbb"
| 138 || September 1 || Padres || 5–2 || Maddux (7–11) || Young (4–5) || Broxton (11) || 44,087 || 68–70
|-  align="center" bgcolor="bbffbb"
| 139 || September 2 || Padres || 8–4 || Kershaw (3–5) || Baek (4–10) || || 39,330 || 69–70
|-  align="center" bgcolor="bbffbb"
| 140 || September 3 || Padres || 6–4 || Kuroda (8–10) || LeBlanc (0–1) || Broxton (12) || 48,822 || 70–70
|-  align="center" bgcolor="bbffbb"
| 141 || September 5 || Diamondbacks || 7–0 || Lowe (12–11) || Haren (14–8) || || 52,270 || 71–70
|-  align="center" bgcolor="bbffbb"
| 142 || September 6 || Diamondbacks || 7–2 || Billingsley (14–10) || Webb (19–7) || || 47,543 || 72–70
|-  align="center" bgcolor="bbffbb"
| 143 || September 7 || Diamondbacks || 5–3 || Kuo (5–2) || Rauch (4–6) || Broxton (13) || 54,137 || 73–70
|-  align="center" bgcolor="ffbbbb"
| 144 || September 8 || @ Padres || 4–0 || Baek (5-10) || Maddux (7–12) || || 25,942 || 73–71
|-  align="center" bgcolor="bbffbb"
| 145 || September 9 || @ Padres || 6–2 || Beimel (5–1) || Bell (6–6) || || 26,614 || 74–71
|-  align="center" bgcolor="bbffbb"
| 146 || September 10 || @ Padres || 7–2 || Lowe (13–11) || Estes (2–2) || || 27,208 || 75–71
|-  align="center" bgcolor="bbffbb"
| 147 || September 12 || @ Rockies || 7–2 || Billingsley (15–10) || Francis (4–10) || || 30,147 || 76–71
|-  align="center" bgcolor="bbffbb"
| 148 || September 13 || @ Rockies || 5–1 || Kershaw (4–5) || de la Rosa (8–8) || || 40,291 || 77–71
|-  align="center" bgcolor="ffbbbb"
| 149 || September 14 || @ Rockies || 1–0 (10) || Corpas (3–3) || Kuo (5–3) || || 28,910 || 77–72
|-  align="center" bgcolor="bbffbb"
| 150 || September 15 || @ Pirates || 8–2 || Kuroda (9–10) || Ohlendorf (1–3) || || 13,147 || 78–72
|-  align="center" bgcolor="bbffbb"
| 151 || September 16 || @ Pirates || 6–2 || Lowe (14–11) || Karstens (2–6) || || 12,741 || 79–72
|-  align="center" bgcolor="ffbbbb"
| 152 || September 17 || @ Pirates || 15–8 || Grabow (6–3) || Elbert (0–1) || || 11,883 || 79–73
|-  align="center" bgcolor="bbffbb"
| 153 || September 18 || @ Pirates || 4–3 (12) || Proctor (2–0) || Hansen (2–7) || Broxton (14) || 12,709 || 80–73
|-  align="center" bgcolor="ffbbbb"
| 154 || September 19 || Giants || 7–1 || Zito (10–16) || Maddux (7–13) || || 55,589 || 80–74
|-  align="center" bgcolor="bbffbb"
| 155 || September 20 || Giants || 10–7 || Saito (4–3) || Walker (4–8) || || 55,724 || 81–74
|-  align="center" bgcolor="ffbbbb"
| 156 || September 21 || Giants || 1–0 (11) || Romo (3–1) || Saito (4–4) || Wilson (40) || 55,294 || 81–75
|-  align="center" bgcolor="bbffbb"
| 157 || September 23 || Padres || 10–1 || Billingsley (16–10) || LeBlanc (1–2) || || 48,905 || 82–75
|-  align="center" bgcolor="bbffbb"
| 158 || September 24 || Padres || 12–4 || Kershaw (5–5) || Ekstrom (0–1) || || 44,776 || 83–75
|-  align="center" bgcolor="ffbbbb"
| 159 || September 25 || Padres || 7–5 || Peavy (10–11) || Stults (2–3) || Hoffman (29) || 52,569 || 83–76
|-  align="center" bgcolor="ffbbbb"
| 160 || September 26 || @ Giants || 6–5 (10) || Walker (5–8) || Johnson (1–2) || || 33,920 || 83–77
|-  align="center" bgcolor="bbffbb"
| 161 || September 27 || @ Giants || 2–1 || Maddux (8–13) || Cain (8–14) || Saito (18) || 38,673 || 84–77
|-  align="center" bgcolor="ffbbbb"
| 162 || September 28 || @ Giants || 3–1 || Lincecum (18–5) || Park (4–4) || Wilson (41) || 39,167 || 84–78
|-

Playoffs

|- align="center" bgcolor="bbffbb"
| 1 || October 1 || @ Cubs || 7–2 || Lowe (1–0) || Dempster (0–1) || || 42,099 || 1–0
|- align="center" bgcolor="bbffbb"
| 2 || October 2 || @ Cubs || 10–3  || Billingsley (1–0) || Zambrano (0–1) || || 42,136 || 2–0
|- align="center" bgcolor="bbffbb"
| 3 || October 4 || Cubs || 3–1 || Kuroda (1–0) || Harden (0–1) || Broxton (1) || 56,000 || 3–0 
|-

|- align="center" bgcolor="ffbbbb"
| 1 || October 9 || @ Phillies || 3–2 || Hamels (1–0) || Lowe (0–1) || Lidge (1) || 45,839 || 0–1
|- align="center" bgcolor="ffbbbb"
| 2 || October 10 || @ Phillies || 8–5 || Myers (1–0) || Billingsley (0–1) || Lidge (2) || 45,883 || 0–2
|- align="center" bgcolor="bbffbb"
| 3 || October 12 || Phillies || 7–2 || Kuroda (1–0) || Moyer (0–1) || || 56,800 || 1–2
|- align="center" bgcolor="ffbbbb"
| 4 || October 13 || Phillies || 7–5 || Madson (1–0) || Wade (0–1) || Lidge (3) || 56,800 || 1–3
|- align="center" bgcolor="ffbbbb"
| 5 || October 15 || Phillies || 5–1 || Hamels (2–0) || Billingsley (0–2) || || 56,800 || 1–4
|-

Player stats
Note: Team batting and pitching leaders in each category are in bold.

Batting
Note: G = Games played; AB = At bats; R = Runs; H = Hits; 2B = Doubles; 3B = Triples; HR = Home runs; RBI = Runs batted in; TB = Total bases; BB = Walks; SO = Strikeouts;  SB = Stolen bases; OBP = On-base percentage; SLG = Slugging; Avg. = Batting average

Pitching 
Note: G = Games played; GS = Games started; IP = Innings pitched; W = Wins; L = Losses; SV = Saves; ERA = Earned run average; BB = Walks; SO = Strikeouts; H = Hits; R = Runs; ER = Earned runs

2008 National League Division Series
The Dodgers advanced to the 2008 NLDS to play the Central Division champion Chicago Cubs. They wound up sweeping the Cubs in three games, taking the first two at Wrigley Field and then ending the series in Game 3 at home. This was the Dodgers first post season series victory since the 1988 World Series and first post season sweep since the 1963 World Series.

Game 1, October 1
Wrigley Field in Chicago

Game 2, October 2
Wrigley Field in Chicago

Game 3, October 4
Dodger Stadium in Los Angeles

2008 National League Championship Series
The Dodgers advanced to the NLCS for the first time since 1988 to play the Philadelphia Phillies, in the fourth National League Championship Series meeting between the two teams.

Game 1, October 9
Citizens Bank Park in Philadelphia

Game 2, October 10
Citizens Bank Park in Philadelphia

Game 3, October 12
Dodger Stadium in Los Angeles

Game 4, October 13
Dodger Stadium in Los Angeles

Game 5, October 15
Dodger Stadium in Los Angeles

2008 Awards
2008 Major League Baseball All-Star Game
Russell Martin reserve
Gold Glove Award
Greg Maddux
Player of the Month
Manny Ramirez August
Player of the Week
Matt Kemp April 28 – May 4
Andre Ethier September 1–7

2008 Minor League Teams

Major League Baseball Draft

The Dodgers selected 45 players in this draft. Of those, eleven of them would eventually play Major League baseball.

The first round pick was right handed pitcher Ethan Martin from Stephens County School in Toccoa, Georgia. He was traded to the Philadelphia Phillies in 2012 (along with this year's second round pick, pitcher Josh Lindblom) and made his Major league debut for the Phillies in 2013.  The fourth round pick, shortstop Dee Gordon became an All-Star as the Dodgers second baseman in 2014, when he also led the league in steals.

References

2008 Los Angeles Dodgers season at Baseball Reference

National League West champion seasons
Los Angeles Dodgers seasons
Los Angeles Dodgers season